The Carlos P. Garcia National Highway, also known as the Davao City Diversion Road, is a  two-to-six lane major highway that serves as a diversion route from the Davao city proper. It also serves as one of the major roads in Davao when traversing towards Tagum.

Currently, the highway serves as the main diversion road for Davao City while the new bypass road is under construction.

The highway is designated as National Route 913 (N913) of the Philippine highway network.

History 
In 1955, Executive Order No. 113 was issued by President Ramon Magsaysay, declaring the highway as a national secondary road. It was declared a national secondary road due to the recommendation of the former National Transportation Board. Therefore, the highway is currently maintained by Department of Public Works and Highways as it was strengthened into a Department Order No. 90 in 1977.

References 

Roads in Davao del Sur
Davao City